The following is a list of vascular plants, bryophytes and lichens which are constant species in one or more community of the British National Vegetation Classification system.

Vascular plants

Grasses

Sedges and rushes

Trees

Other dicotyledons

Other monocotyledons

Ferns

Clubmosses

Bryophytes

Mosses

Liverworts

Lichens

 

British National Vegetation Classification
Lists of biota of the United Kingdom
British National Vegetation Classification, constant